Eric Hope (2 December 1927 – 11 August 2009) was an English professional footballer who played as an inside forward. He made appearances in the English Football League for Shrewsbury Town and Wrexham.

References

1927 births
2009 deaths
English footballers
Association football forwards
Manchester City F.C. players
Shrewsbury Town F.C. players
Wrexham A.F.C. players
GKN Sankey F.C. players
English Football League players